Lloyd Noel (December 13, 1934 – July 3, 2017) was a Grenadian attorney who served as Attorney General of Grenada from 1979 to 1980.

He died in Brooklyn, New York, at age 83.  He was buried in the Dougaldston Cemetery in Saint John Parish, Grenada.

See also
Outline of Grenada
Index of Grenada-related articles

Notes

1934 births
2017 deaths
Attorneys General of Grenada
20th-century Grenadian lawyers